The Canon de 274 modèle 1893/1896 were a family of French naval guns developed in the years before World War I that armed a variety of warships of the French Navy.  Guns salvaged from scrapped ships found a second life as coastal artillery and railway artillery during World War I.

Design
The mle 1893/1896 guns were typical built-up guns of the period with several layers of steel reinforcing hoops.  The guns used an interrupted screw breech and fired separate loading bagged charges and projectiles.  They were shorter and lighter than the preceding Canon de 274 modèle 1887/1893 and despite being shorter they used a larger propellant charge which gave them higher muzzle velocity and range than their predecessors.

Naval Use
Mle 1893/1896 guns armed coastal defense ships, ironclads and pre-dreadnoughts of the French Navy built or refit between 1887-1905.

Coastal defense ships
 Terrible Class - Three ships of this class the Caïman, Indomptable, and Requin received two single mount mle 1893/1896 guns during refits in 1901.
Ironclads
 Redoutable - This ship received three mle 1893/1896 guns in single mounts after an 1894 refit.

Pre-dreadnoughts
 Henri IV - The primary armament of this ship consisted of two mle 1893/1896 guns in single turrets fore and aft of the ship's superstructure.

Railway guns
During World War I four guns were removed from Caïman and Indomptable and converted by Schneider to railway guns. These were designated Canon de 274 modèle 93/96 Berceau and they were widely used.

Ammunition
Ammunition was of separate loading type with a bagged charge and projectile.

The guns were able to fire:
 Armor Piercing Capped - 
 Common Incendiary - 
 Semi-Armor Piercing Capped -

Bibliography

References

External links
 http://www.navweaps.com/Weapons/WNFR_10-40_m1893.php

Naval guns of France
274 mm artillery